Ovid's Metamorphoses or The Satyrs is a sculpture by Auguste Rodin, created as part of The Gates of Hell.

Inspiration
It draws on the tale of Salmacis and Hermaphroditus in Book IV, lines 285-388 of Ovid's Metamorphoses. One edition of the bronze cast of it is now in the Museo Soumaya in Mexico City.
Another edition of this bronze cast is on display at the Yamasaki Majak Museum of Art in Nagoya Japan.

His models were two ballerinas at the Paris Opera, recommended to him in the mid-1880s by Edgar Degas. They also served as models for his Psyche, Daphne and Cupid and Cursed Women.

See also
List of sculptures by Auguste Rodin

References

External links

1889 sculptures
Sculptures of the Museo Soumaya
Sculptures by Auguste Rodin
Bronze sculptures in Mexico
Sculptures based on Metamorphoses